The Furness Railway (Furness) was a railway company operating in the Furness area of Lancashire in North West England.

History

Formation
In the early 1840s, the owners of iron ore mines in the Furness district of Lancashire became interested in a waggonway from their mines to Barrow; the project was adopted and expanded by the Duke of Buccleuch and the Earl of Burlington. Advertisements in 1843 announced a scheme, supported by their Lordships, for a Furness Railway to link Ulverston 'the capital of the district', iron ore mines (at Dalton-in-Furness) and slate mines (at Kirkby-in-Furness) with the coast at Barrow harbour and at Piel pier.  Traffic on the line would be horse-drawn, but the line was to be laid out to allow easy conversion to the use of steam power. 
A survey had already been carried out by James Walker. "The primary object of this undertaking" explained a subsequent advertisement "is to improve the present very dilatory provision for the transport of the valuable Mineral products of Furness and adjoining Districts to the Coast" but it was noted from the start that much of the line would form part of any coastal route north from Lancaster.

The subscription to the company was largely taken up by the Duke and the Earl, and their associates; although there were some local subscribers - Henry Schneider was on the company's provisional committee - failure to attract local capital meant that the original intention to serve Ulverston was dropped. The company's Bill was not opposed in Parliament and the Act was given Royal Assent on 23 May 1844. A further Act in 1846 authorised extensions from Kirkby to Broughton-in-Furness, and from Dalton to Ulverston. Goods traffic began running between Dalton and Barrow in June 1846, operated by a single locomotive. The line was passed for passenger use early in August 1846; by the end of the month, passenger trains were running from Dalton to Piel pier, connecting with a steamer to Fleetwood. 

At a celebratory excursion and dinner for the directors and friends held at the end of October 1846, it was remarked that the mineral traffic was limited by a shortage of wagons (which prevented the Dalton branch handling more than 2,000 tons of iron ore a day) and of locomotives (which meant that the Kirkby branch was not yet being worked), and that 10,000 of the 12,000 passengers carried so far were excursionists from Fleetwood or Blackpool. Passenger services ceased after about two months, and the line between Dalton and Rampside Junction was doubled to remove the difficulties experienced in working both mineral and passenger traffic on a single track line. In 1847, differences between the railway company and the owner of Piel pier saw the Fleetwood steamer running to Barrow; it returned to Piel pier in 1848; subsequently, steamers also ran between Piel pier and Poulton-le-Sands, connecting with the "Little" North Western Railway. Periodic disagreements and reconciliations saw the steamer service terminal switch between Piel and Barrow on a number of occasions until (1853) the Furness Railway bought the pier.

Extensions
The Kirkby branch was extended to Broughton, passing inspection for passenger traffic at the end of February 1848; when a Broughton to Barrow train was derailed by mis-set points in July 1849, it was noted that "nearly all the gates and points on the Furness line are attended by women" and that a woman had the management of the points which had been mis-set. The Dalton branch was extended to Lindal (goods traffic running from mines there from early May 1851) and then on to Ulverston, eight waggons of coal being delivered there from Whitehaven in April 1854, even before the station was complete; passenger services began in June 1854, In 1854, 330,000 tons of iron ore travelled over the railway (as against 225,000 tons the previous year), other goods traffic was up from 22,000 tons in 1853 to 40,000 tons, and there were 145,000 passenger movements (95,000 in 1853); the company declared a dividend at a rate of 6% a year.

Copper mining interests at Coniston promoted the Coniston Railway, running from the Furness Railway at Broughton to Coniston and on to the copper mines. The line was nominally independent of the FR, but the Duke of Devonshire (as the Earl of Burlington had become in 1858) was its chairman; the FR took shares in it, and worked it. It opened for passenger traffic 19 July 1859, although its opening for goods and mineral traffic was deferred for some months as the provision was still incomplete.   The Furness Railway obtained powers to amalgamate the Coniston Railway with it in 1862.

A branch was built from (just west of) the Leven viaduct to Greenodd (allowing suppression of a swing bridge in the viaduct) then through Newby Bridge to a terminus  beside Windermere at Finsthwaite; the locality had been known as The Landing, but the station was named Lake-side. The line opened June 1869; a company part-owned (after 1873 fully owned) by the FR ran Windermere steamer services in conjunction with the trains, a Bowness resident promptly writing to the Times to query the absence of lifeboats on the steamers.

Connections and acquisitions

Whitehaven and Furness Junction Railway
The Whitehaven and Furness Junction Railway was completed in November 1851, connecting the Furness Railway to Whitehaven and (on completion of the Bransty tunnel at Whitehaven in 1852) to the West Coast Main Line at Carlisle. In 1865, the W&FJR was leased by the Furness Railway, a full amalgamation taking effect 1 July 1866 being authorised by an Act of 1866 The secretary-manager of the W&FJR became secretary of the Furness Railway, whose general manager was promoted to the board of the company, retaining his salary but now being styled 'resident director' The Furness Railway now extended to Whitehaven, with running powers to Workington, and to the iron works on the North side of the Derwent there; the FR also inherited the W&FJR's involvement in the Cleator and Furness Railway, a joint line with the Whitehaven Cleator and Egremont Railway linking the WC&ER at Egremont with the W&FJR at Sellafield to simplify the movement of ore southwards; the line opened 1 August 1869. 

In 1865, before the lease and amalgamation, the W&FJR and the FR had put forward rival Bills for crossing the Duddon estuary much lower down it than the existing crossing at Foxfield, thus usefully shortening the rail distance between Whitehaven (and points north) and Barrow (and Carnforth). The parliamentary committee had decided in favour of the W&FJR, and the scheme was inherited by the FR. However, in 1868 the FR decided to abandon the project: there was a trade recession (the FR's dividend being consequently reduced to 8% from its accustomed 10%) and the FR had recently made major capital outlays on the Furness and Midland line (£100,000) and the construction of wet docks at Barrow (£200,000): an Act sanctioning the abandonment was obtained in 1869  but the FR had henceforth to charge on the basis of the mileages if the crossing had been built. After the discovery of a large hematite deposit in the Holborn Hill area, the line between Millom and Barrow was doubled throughout; the line between Seascale and Bootle was also doubled.

Ulverstone and Lancaster Railway

From its opening, the U&LR was worked by the Furness Railway, which purchased it (with effect from July 1861) in 1862, taking over the Ulverston Canal Company in the same year. The line from Barrow to Ulverston was already double-track, and the line between Ulverston and Carnforth was doubled in 1863.

Furness and Midland Joint Railway
In 1863, in conjunction with the Midland Railway, the FR promoted a Bill for the Furness and Midland Joint Railway between Wennington and Carnforth; the intention was said to be to give a more direct connection between the iron ore of Furness and Yorkshire ironworks and coal-mines. The London and North Western Railway cast doubt on this, pointing out that Furness got its metallurgical coke from South Durham over the Stainmore line and exported most of its ore to districts better served by the LNWR, but withdrew its objection on being offered the same powers as the Midland over the FR. The F&MJR opened for passenger traffic 6 June 1867; it was worked by the Midland. This single-track line was intended to shorten the distance to Barrow for the coke traffic over Stainmore. In 1870, the FR brought forward, and then abandoned, a Bill  authorising abandonment of the project; construction was pursued with no great urgency, the line not opening until June 1876.

Lines in the West Cumberland ore-field
The FR objected when in 1877 the Whitehaven, Cleator and Egremont Railway agreed terms for its amalgamation with the LNWR; instead as of July 1879 the WC&ER became a joint line of the Furness and the LNWR. The FR also bought shares in the Cleator and Workington Junction Railway, and worked the main line of the C&WJR.

Development of Barrow
The Furness Railway's prosperity came originally from the export of haematite ore, but the growth of heavy industry at Barrow became a significant contributor. In 1867, The Engineer explained why the demand for Furness haematite had formerly been limited:

"The ironstone mines there had been worked for some considerable time, and the ore was carried by rail and by sea to the coal districts of Lancashire, to the Staffordshire blast furnaces, and to Wales. The mining operations were, of course, very limited, and the price of the ore subject to extensive fluctuations, owing to the circumstance that the red haematite ore was only used as an admixture to other ores to improve the quality of iron, and the ironmasters used a small proportion of this more expensive ore, or tried to do entirely without it, whenever they could not obtain a sufficiently remunerative price for their pig iron in the market. Pure hematite iron, as such, was generally disliked in the trade on account of a certain amount of red shortness which it was known to give to all kinds of puddled iron produced from it;  besides the red hematite was thought difficult to smelt by itself"

It had been reported that in 1856, 464,823 tons of iron ore were raised in Furness "of which 445,013 tons were carried over the Furness Railway and shipped at Barrow, 16,290 on the Ulverston canal, and 3,550 consumed at the Charcoal Iron Furnaces and at the Low Furness Iron and Steel Works. Of the ore carried over the Furness line 200,000 tons are sent to Wales , and the remainder to the Staffordshire, Cleveland and West Riding Iron districts."

A very small village at Barrow grew into one of about 2,000 serving the ore-export facility there, with the Furness Railway effectively responsible for the settlement. The FR took over Barrow Harbour from its Commissioners in 1863 to allow the construction of wet docks at Barrow; in 1864 it obtained powers to supply Barrow and the surrounding district with gas and water.

Barrow grew rapidly in the 1860s, as The Engineer ("A town of about 20,000 inhabitants, grown up from a village of scarcely one-tenth the population in the short space of seven years is a unicum in European geography")noted. It gave two reasons:  
"The stimulus to which in the first instance the rapid rise of Barrow-in-Furness has been due, is the erection of blast furnaces on that spot for the production of pig iron from the red hematite ore, belonging to the district near Barrow and Ulverston, and further north of both towns" The first blast furnaces had been brought into operation at Barrow in 1859. Proximity to mines, and to Barrow harbour, and "the advantage of obtaining coke and coal as return freights from the places to which hematite ore was carried" had allowed "extraordinary economy and consequent commercial success.":
"But there was another fact still more decisive and important for the prosperity of the Barrow blast furnaces and for the prosperity of the whole mining district surrounding them, and that was the adoption of the Bessemer process. No sooner had Mr. Bessemer's great invention got into practical use than there arose an almost unlimited demand for pure hematite iron."
  
Witnesses for the Furness and Midland Joint bill reported that in 1862 over 535,000 tons of iron ore had been raised in Furness (in 1873 the market price of haematite ore was 24-30 shillings per ton) and over 90,000 tons of pig iron produced in local blast furnaces.

In 1860, there were four blast furnaces in operation at Barrow, in 1862 seven, in 1866 ten, in 1867 eleven; the Barrow Hematite Steel Company operating what was then "the largest Bessemer steel works in the country" and "one of the largest in the world". The Dukes of Devonshire and Buccleuch were both major shareholders in the steel company as was the managing director of the Furness Railway, who was also the managing director of the Hematite Steel company and (following the incorporation in 1867 of Barrow) its first mayor. (Similarly, after the Phoenix Park Murders, Lord Frederick Cavendish was said to have been a director of the Furness Railway, the Barrow Hematite Steel Company, the Barrow Jute and Flax Company, and the Barrow Shipbuilding Company.)

The docks at Barrow opened in September 1867; there were two wet docks; the Devonshire (30 acres) and the Buccleuch (33 acres). The Midland Railway's Morecambe-Belfast steamer service was replaced by a Barrow-Belfast service jointly owned by the Midland and the FR; a service to Douglas was also run in the summer months, but both services ran from Piel pier transferring to Barrow docks in 1881. In 1872, the FR obtained powers to build a third dock (the Ramsden); the spoil from the excavation of this was used to enclose an area of water intended for the construction of a fourth  (the Cavendish).

The original main line did not run through Barrow, though its headquarters and engineering works were adjacent to St. George's Square. Through  trains had to run into the terminal station and then out again to continue their journey. The new Barrow Central railway station was not opened until 1882, when through working became possible. In 1882, a new station Barrow Central was opened on a new loop line, which the Whitehaven- Carnforth passenger traffic now ran over. The old station at the dockside was retained as the goods station.

Issues with development outside Barrow 
Heavy expenditure on the docks at Barrow coincided with a down-turn in the iron trade in the mid-1870s; capital expenditure on other projects was minimised, and the dividend was cut from 10% to 6.5%. This triggered complaints from shareholders that the directors were pursuing the development of Barrow at the expense of the profitability of the FR, and from passengers at the service provided - with the possible exception of fast trains serving Barrow (which did not stop at most stations) FR passenger trains were infrequent, inconvenient, unpunctual, uncomfortable, and slow. The Directors rely too much on the mineral traffic and ignore the cultivation of the passenger traffic. A glance at the timetables shows that it is almost impossible to reach some of the most beautiful places on Morecambe Bay in anything like reasonable time, and the accommodation at Carnforth, when the delay takes place, is most miserable. On the Furness side of the line there are two seats for about 200 passengers, one waiting room, and one refreshment room, which is frequently so crammed that many people cannot get to the counter. Added to this inconvenience, travellers who have to wait here are oppressed with a sense of the general dirtiness of the station. The trains also run at inconvenient times, and the waiting for them at Carnforth involves great loss of valuable time. There is no train that takes passengers from Lancaster to Silverdale under forty-five minutes, a distance of ten miles! The slowest train being an hour and thirty-five minutes. These are the advertised times, but the trains are not infrequently late, consequently a good walker might almost accomplish the journey on foot in the time.
The company chairman (the Duke of Devonshire) subsequently conceded that several of the stations " until lately, were in a condition of which the public had a right to complain ... On the Whitehaven section especially some of the stations were of the most inferior description, and such as the Board of Trade would not have allowed them to continue; they were mere temporary structure, scarcely more than wooden hovels."

Hard times
In 1881, revenue for the second half of the year was about £300,000 and the dividend 7% a year; second-half revenue declined to £216,000 in 1885 (with the dividend being cut to 2%), but recovered to £275,000 in 1889, allowing a dividend of 5% a year. In 1892, there was no dividend for the first year-half (because of a prolonged strike in the Durham coalfield) this triggered a renewal of previous complaints from shareholders that the company had sunk between two and three million pounds into docks at Barrow, but refused to give any indication of the profitability (or otherwise) of the docks. The additional complaint was now made that most of the directors were ornamental and deferred to Sir James Ramsden who had held managerial posts with the company since 1846, and had been the managing director since 1866. For the second half of 1892, despite the disruption to traffic and loss of an engine caused by subsidence at Lindal, a dividend at the rate of 3% a year was declared; amendments seeking to force the resignation of Sir James were moved, but defeated.

The secretary of the FR denied that its low dividends were caused by injudicious expenditure on Barrow docks; without them there would be no dividend at all: "The docks have led to the development of many industries in Barrow and the establishment of many feeders to our line".  The problem was foreign competition: "..the introduction of Spanish ore into England has led to a serious diminution of the receipts of the Furness Railway company owing to the reduction in price it has affected all over the country in pig iron and steel; and whereas we used to send away nearly half a million tons of ore to Middlesbrough and other places at rates which gave us an average of 3s. a ton, we are now carrying that ore - in less quantities, I am sorry to say - to the furnaces at short distances, and we get an average of only 1s. a ton, Therefore it is not the docks which have reduced our dividends, but the introduction of Spanish ore and the altered circumstances of the trade." In 1894, it was reported that only 33 of the 75 blast furnaces in Furness and West Cumberland were working.

Management changes
In May 1895, Sir James Ramsden, by now 73, resigned due to ill health. He was not replaced as managing director. A new general manager (Alfred Aslett) was recruited from the Cambrian Railways, where he had 'worked wonders ... from being one of the most sluggish it has become one of the most enterprising lines in the kingdom' The incumbent 'secretary and general manager' became 'secretary' only  (his assistant, Ramsden's son, became 'superintendent of the line') before retiring in 1897 after thirty-three years in the post; the locomotive superintendent retired at the same time after forty-six years with the company.

The new regime benefited from a recovery in the Furness iron and steel trade, and from a wholesale replacement of passenger rolling stock occasioned by the need to provide a continuous automatic brake, but also made strenuous efforts to develop passenger traffic, with day and weekend excursion tickets being introduced and advertised. Second class was abolished (1897) and new corridor bogie carriages introduced  on Barrow-Yorkshire services were as good as anything to be found on major railways. To promote tourist traffic, the FR published guides to tours in the Lake District not only in English, but also in French and German.  By 1903, passenger revenue was 40% higher than that for 1895, and passenger revenue per train-mile was 10d higher. The Railway Magazine of August 1898 described the Furness Railway as one "which, though a comparatively small line, is noted for its enterprise and go-ahead management."; by the second half of 1899 the dividend had recovered to 4% per annum, "entirely due to the ability an exertions of their excellent general manager" according to the company chairman. The dividend, however, fell back to 0.5% in 1904 because of a renewed depression in iron and steel; Mr Aslett having previously reported that pig iron could only be produced in Furness at a loss of 3s 6d per ton: England was the 'dumping ground' for German iron being sold at below its production cost. Vickers had taken over the Barrow Shipbuilding Company in 1897, and its construction of naval warships at Barrow (both as part of the Anglo-German naval arms race and for foreign navies) became an important prop of the prosperity of Barrow. Even with this prop, and the development of tourist traffic, the FR dividend for the last twenty-five years of its existence (up to Grouping in 1923) averaged only marginally above 2% a year.

Relationship with Midland Railway
The FR had been closely associated with the Midland Railway for many years; it was strategically important to the Midland as giving it access to an Irish Sea port and hence to Irish traffic. The Midland had repeatedly attempted to purchase the company, but these offers had come during periods of prosperity for the Furness, whose directors had rebuffed the Midland's terms as insufficiently generous. The Midland's announcement of a planned extension of its Morecambe line to a new deep-water port at Heysham gave rise to concern about the future of steamer services from Barrow and the reliability of the Midland as a partner. Negotiations with the Midland led to a further offer to purchase the FR (with a guaranteed 3% dividend to FR shareholders) which was again rejected, and ended in an agreement that the joint Furness/Midland steamers from Barrow would continue to run, and the same company which managed (and owned a third of the shares in) the Barrow steamers for the railways would also manage the services from Heysham. When services began running from Heysham in 1905, the Barrow services became unprofitable: it became evident that the Midland was preferentially routing traffic via Heysham and the Furness went to law, the matter being resolved by the Midland buying out the FR's interest for £45,000, entering a traffic-sharing agreement for Belfast traffic and undertaking to continue the services from Barrow for seven years.

Locomotive superintendents
 James Ramsden, 1846–1850
 Richard Mason, 1850–1896
 W. F. Pettigrew, 1896–1918
 David Rutherford, 1918–1923

Locomotives

The first locomotive superintendent, recruited from Bury, Curtis and Kennedy in 1846, was later to be knighted as Sir James Ramsden, a leading civic figure and first Mayor of Barrow. No locomotives were actually built in the local works itself: they were generally standard designs, purchased from other manufacturers.  By 1921, fifteen different works were represented. However, W. F. Pettigrew, who had taken over operations in 1896, was to introduce some measure of standardisation.

There were also carriage and wagon-building shops, and repairs and maintenance was carried out on the equipment of Barrow Docks.

Line details
 Viaducts: The line crosses several major estuaries - the rivers Kent and Leven being among them - over substantial viaducts.
 Total mileage (lines owned or worked) (1912): .

Barrow Docks

Details given are those shown for 1912:
 Total area of water: 
 Four docks: Devonshire; Buccleuch; Ramsden; and Cavendish. There was also a Timber Dock.
 Length of quays 
 Messrs Vickers built major ships for the Royal Navy here
 There was also a deep water berth in Walney Channel

Ships
Barrow-Fleetwood service - four paddle steamers; lake steamers - two on Coniston Water; six on Windermere; three Barrow steam tugs

Barrow-Fleetwood

Coniston Water

Windermere

Other Furness Railway ships

Other statistics
 As at 31 December 1911 the Railway owned rolling stock as follows:
 130 locomotives; 348 coaching vehicles; 7766 goods vehicles; 2 steam rail motor cars
 Locomotives painted Indian red; passenger vehicles ultramarine blue with white upper panels
 Passengers carried (year ending 31 December 1911) 3,297,622

The Furness Railway operated as an independent company until December 1922, when it was merged as one of the constituent companies of the London, Midland and Scottish Railway following the Railways Act 1921.

See also
 Cleator and Furness Railway
 Cumbrian Coast Line (history)
 Furness and Midland Joint Railway
 Whitehaven, Cleator and Egremont Railway
 Ulverstone and Lancaster Railway
 The Furness Railway Pub and Hotel

References

Notes

Further reading

External links

 CRA Photo Archives
 Cumbrian Railways Association
 Furness Railway Trust

 
Railway companies established in 1844
Railway lines opened in 1846
Companies based in Barrow-in-Furness
Railway companies disestablished in 1922
London, Midland and Scottish Railway constituents
Pre-grouping British railway companies
History of Barrow-in-Furness
Furness
Barrow-in-Furness
1844 establishments in England
British companies established in 1844